What/If (stylized as WHAT/ IF) is an American thriller miniseries, created by Mike Kelley, that premiered on May 24, 2019, on Netflix. The series stars Jane Levy, Blake Jenner, Daniella Pineda, Keith Powers, Samantha Marie Ware, Dave Annable, Saamer Usmani, John Clarence Stewart, Louis Herthum, and Renée Zellweger.

Premise
What/If is a neo-noir thriller that, according to Deadline Hollywood'''s Nellie Andreeva, explores "the ripple effects of what happens when acceptable people start doing unacceptable things. Each season will tackle a different morality tale inspired by culturally consequential source material, and the power of a single fateful decision to change the trajectory of an entire life."

Cast and characters
Main

Jane Levy as Lisa Ruiz-Donovan, the CEO and founder of a biotech startup called Emigen Molecular Sequencing
Blake Jenner as Sean Donovan, Lisa's husband. A former pitcher for the San Francisco Giants, he now works as an EMT.
Keith Powers as Todd Archer, Sean's best friend since high school. He works with Sean as a fellow EMT.
Samantha Marie Ware as Angela Archer, Todd's wife. A surgical resident, she has been having an affair with Ian Evans.
Juan Castano as Marcos Ruiz, Lisa's brother and an attorney
Dave Annable as Dr. Ian Evans, the chief of surgery
Saamer Usmani as Avery Watkins, the new COO of Emigen Molecular Sequencing
Daniella Pineda as Cassidy Barrett, Lisa's best friend and the CFO of Emigen Molecular Sequencing
John Clarence Stewart as Lionel, Marcos' boyfriend and a real estate broker
Louis Herthum as Foster, Anne's right-hand man
Renée Zellweger as Anne Montgomery, a venture capitalist based in San Francisco

Recurring
Derek Smith as Kevin, a go-go boy with whom Marcos and Lionel have slept
Nana Ghana as Sophie
Monique Kim as Miles
Allie MacDonald as Maddie Carter, Sean's ex-girlfriend
Gabriel Mann as Gage Scott, Anne's business frenemy
Julian Sands as Liam Strom, Anne's financial backer and mentor

Guest
Marissa Cuevas as Christine, a former high-school cheer captain
Keegan Allen as Billy, Christine's ex-boyfriend from high school and a commercial director

Production
Development
On August 17, 2018, it was announced that Netflix had given the production a series order for a first season consisting of ten episodes. The series was created by Mike Kelley who was also expected to write for the series. Executive producers were slated to include Kelley, Melissa Loy, Alex Gartner, Charles Roven, Robert Zemeckis, and Jack Rapke. Additionally, Jackie Levine was slated to serve as a co-executive producer and Phillip Noyce was expected to direct and executive produce the first two episodes. Production companies involved with the series were expected to consist of Page Fright, Atlas Entertainment, Compari Entertainment, and Warner Bros. Television. On April 23, 2019, it was announced that the series would premiere on May 24, 2019.

Casting
Alongside the series order announcement, it was confirmed that Renée Zellweger had been cast in the series' lead role. In August 2018, it was announced that Jane Levy and Blake Jenner had joined the cast in starring roles. In September 2018, it was reported that Samantha Ware, Juan Castano, Keith Powers, Saamer Usmani, Dave Annable, and Louis Herthum had been cast in the series with Herthum in a recurring role.

In December 2018, it was announced that Daniella Pineda had joined the main cast in a series regular role and that Tyler Ross, Derek Smith, Nana Ghana, Monique Kim, and Marissa Cuevas would appear in a recurring capacity.

Episodes

Release
On April 23, 2019, the official teaser for the series was released. On May 13, 2019, Netflix released the official trailer for the first season.

Reception
On review aggregator Rotten Tomatoes, the series holds an approval rating of 42% based on 33 reviews, with an average rating of 5.35/10. The website's critical consensus reads, " A deliriously delicious performance from Renée Zellweger can't save What/If from its own mediocrity, but boy is her juicy scene chewing fun to watch." On Metacritic, it has a weighted average score of 58 out of 100, based on 12 critics, indicating "mixed or average reviews".

Haider Rifaat of The Express Tribune wrote, "The writing is pretty much the heart of the show. Immaculate dialogues, nuanced characters and relationships, both broken and unscathed, are a few exciting features that make it compelling. Not to forgo the incredible acting prowess of Zellweger, who impeccably embraces the character of Anne. Subtle gestures, symbolic interaction and character development are some commendable aspects that intensify the actors’ performances." NPR's Linda Holmes concluded: "... it's not a good show, but it's entertaining in a very specific way. Zellweger has sunk her teeth so deeply into this notion of Welcome To Rich Prowling Cougartown that she's practically licking up bowls of milk. Everything in What/If'' is forever being revealed and unfurled and figuratively glitter-bombed, and if I were trying to distract myself from the problems of the world and had perhaps a tankard of wine and a dear friend at my disposal, I just might put my head on a fuzzy pillow and fire it up."

References

External links
 
 

2010s American drama television miniseries
2019 American television series debuts
2019 American television series endings
American thriller television series
English-language Netflix original programming
Serial drama television series
Television series by Warner Bros. Television Studios
Television shows filmed in California
Television shows set in San Francisco